Fontanigorda is a comune (municipality) in the Metropolitan City of Genoa in the Italian region Liguria, located about  northeast of Genoa.

Fontanigorda borders the following municipalities: Fascia, Montebruno, Rezzoaglio, Rovegno.

Twin towns — sister cities
Fontanigorda is twinned with:

  Saint-Maime, France (1997)

References

Cities and towns in Liguria